Acanthocereus is a genus of cacti. Its species take the form of shrubs with arching or climbing stems up to several meters in height.  The generic name is derived from the Greek word άκανθα (acantha), meaning spine, and the Latin word cereus, meaning candle. The genus is native to the mostly tropical Americas from Texas and the southern tip of Florida to the northern part of South America (Colombia and Venezuela), including islands of the Caribbean.

Description

The plants form bushes which later usually overhanging or spreading and are rarely tree-shaped. Stems have 3 to 5 ribs, typically thin, with stout spines. The little scaly pericarpel and the long, stiff, upright flower tube are covered with a few thorns that soon decay and little wool. The fruits are spherical to ovoid or pear-shaped red or green, bare or thorny, tear-open or non-tear-open and contain broadly oval, shiny black seeds of up to 4.8 millimeter.

Taxonomy
The name was first used by George Engelmann in 1863, although he did not describe its characters, leaving it to Alwin Berger in 1905 to define it as a subsection of Cereus. In 1909, Nathaniel Britton and Joseph Nelson Rose elevated Acanthocereus to a genus.

Species 
, Plants of the World Online accepted the following species:

Species formerly placed in the genus that have been moved to other genera include:
Acanthocereus brasiliensis Britton & Rose → Strophocactus brasiliensis
Acanthocereus sicariguensis Croizat & Tamayo → Strophocactus sicariguensis

Distribution

References

External links 

Hylocereeae
Cactoideae genera
Cacti of North America
Cacti of South America
Flora of the Caribbean
Flora of Central America
Taxa named by Alwin Berger
Taxa named by George Engelmann
Taxa named by Nathaniel Lord Britton
Taxa named by Joseph Nelson Rose